Mannix Román  (born ) is a Puerto Rican volleyball player. He was part of the Puerto Rico men's national volleyball team at the 2014 FIVB Volleyball Men's World Championship in Poland. He played for Mets de Guaynabo.

Clubs
 Mets de Guaynabo (2014)

References

1983 births
Living people
Puerto Rican men's volleyball players
Place of birth missing (living people)